Meineckia filipes is a species of plant in the family Phyllanthaceae. It is endemic to the Socotra Islands in the Indian Ocean, part of the Republic of Yemen.  Its natural habitats are subtropical or tropical dry forests and subtropical or tropical dry shrubland.

References

Endemic flora of Socotra
filipes
Data deficient plants
Taxonomy articles created by Polbot
Taxa named by Isaac Bayley Balfour
Taxa named by Grady Webster